Naryn (Narin) is a rural locality (a selo) in Dzhidinsky District, Republic of Buryatia, Russia. The population was 357 as of 2017. There are 2 streets.

Geography 
Naryn is located 64 km west of Petropavlovka (the district's administrative centre) by road. Kharatsay is the nearest rural locality.

References 

Rural localities in Dzhidinsky District